Luanshya Airport  is an airstrip serving Luanshya, a city in the Copperbelt Province of Zambia. The runway is within the city, and has an additional  dirt overrun on the east end, narrowing to an aligned dirt road of indeterminate length.

See also

Transport in Zambia
List of airports in Zambia

References

External links
OpenStreetMap - Luanshya
FallingRain - Luanshya Zambia Airport

 Google Earth

Airports in Zambia
Luanshya
Buildings and structures in Copperbelt Province